Anthony Hamlett is an American mixed martial artist and fight promoter from Washington state. He is the head coach and manager of Northwest Elite Fight Team. He has also been a professional referee in the Northwest and referred the UFC.  He has refereed  over 3000 fights between amateur and pro.  He is looked at as the top ref in MMA for the NW.

Military service
Anthony Hamlett was in the US Air Force from March 1992- October 2000.

Wrestling career
Anthony Hamlett in the USWF/USA WRESTLING ALL-AMERICANS  A three time All American for the USAF  team ranked as high as 5th in nation after world team trials

Grappling career
ADCC Championships 2000
March 1, 2 & 3rd 2000 in Abu Dhabi, UAE the -65 kg class.
Anthony Hamlett Defeated Hiroyuki Abe, and Joao Roque. Anthony suffered a loss to Royler Gracie and Joe Gilbert to place 4th at the Abu Dhabi World Championship after just one yr of pure grappling training coming over from wrestling

Championships and accomplishments
HOOKnSHOOT
 Featherweight World Champion (One time)

Mixed martial arts record

|-
| Loss
| align=center| 8–14
| Roy Bradshaw
| Submission (guillotine choke)
| COTC - Conquest of the Cage 14
| 
| align=center| 1
| align=center| 0:30
| Airway Heights, Washington, United States
|
|-
| Loss
| align=center| 8–13
| Ian Loveland
| Submission (rear naked choke)
| SF 14 - Resolution
| 
| align=center| 1
| align=center| 1:04
| Portland, Oregon, United States
| 
|-
| Loss
| align=center| 8–12
| Chris Mickle
| Submission (punches)
| FCC 18 - Freestyle Combat Challenge 18
| 
| align=center| 1
| align=center| N/A
| Racine, Wisconsin, United States
|
|-
| Loss
| align=center| 8–11
| Chad Nelson
| Submission (shoulder injury)
| FCFF - Rumble at the Roseland 11
| 
| align=center| 1
| align=center| 3:43
| Portland, Oregon, United States
|
|-
| Loss
| align=center| 8–10
| Cole Escovedo
| TKO (punches)
|  WEC 8: Halloween Fury 2
| 
| align=center| 2
| align=center| 1:30
| Lemoore, California, United States
| 
|-
| Loss
| align=center| 8–9
| Brandon Bledsoe
| Submission (armbar)
| HOOKnSHOOT - Absolute Fighting Championships 3
| 
| align=center| 1
| align=center| 1:26
| Fort Lauderdale, Florida, United States
|
|-
| Win
| align=center| 8–8
| Steve Hallock
| Decision (majority)
| TFC 6 - Fightzone 6
| 
| align=center| 3
| align=center| 5:00
| Toledo, Ohio, United States
| 
|-
| Loss
| align=center| 7–8
| Blake Fredrickson
| TKO (injury)
| WFF - World Freestyle Fighting 3
| 
| align=center| 1
| align=center| 2:16
| Vancouver, British Columbia, Canada
|
|-
| Loss
| align=center| 7–7
| Hermes Franca
| TKO (punches)
| HOOKnSHOOT - New Wind
| 
| align=center| 1
| align=center| N/A
| Evansville, Indiana, United States
| 
|-
| Win
| align=center| 7–6
| Caleb Mitchell
| TKO (punches)
| WEC 3 - All or Nothing
| 
| align=center| 3
| align=center| 3:45
| Lemoore, California, United States
| 
|-
| Loss
| align=center| 6–6
| Bobby Andrews
| Submission (crucifix)
| USMMA 1 - Ring of Fury
| 
| align=center| 2
| align=center| 1:06
| Lowell, Massachusetts, United States
|
|-
| Loss
| align=center| 6–5
| Edson Diniz
| Submission (punches)
| WEF 11 - The Come Back
| 
| align=center| 3
| align=center| 1:21
| Fort Lauderdale, Florida, United States
|
|-
| Loss
| align=center| 6–4
| Paul Gardner
| Submission (kimura)
| Rumble in the Ring 4
| 
| align=center| 1
| align=center| N/A
| Auburn, Washington, United States
|
|-
| Win
| align=center| 6–3
| Jeff Curran
| KO (elbow)
| HOOKnSHOOT - Kings 2
| 
| align=center| 1
| align=center| 0:11
| Evansville, Indiana, United States
| 
|-
| Win
| align=center| 5–3
| David Guigui
| TKO (strikes)
| IFC WC 16 - Warriors Challenge 16
| 
| align=center| 3
| align=center| 3:10
| United States
| 
|-
| Loss
| align=center| 4–3
| Jimmy Terrel
| Decision
| WEC 2: Clash of the Titans
| 
| align=center| 3
| align=center| 5:00
| Lemoore, California, United States
| 
|-
| Win
| align=center| 4–2
| Kevin Smith
| TKO (injury)
| RITR 3 - Rumble in the Ring 3
| 
| align=center| 2
| align=center| 0:35
| Auburn, Washington, United States
| 
|-
| Loss
| align=center| 3–2
| Charlie Pearson
| TKO (retirement)
| AMC - Return of the Gladiators 2
| 
| align=center| 2
| align=center| 5:00
| Washington, United States
|
|-
| Loss
| align=center| 3–1
| Uchu Tatsumi
| Submission (rear-naked choke)
| Shooto - R.E.A.D 7
| 
| align=center| 1
| align=center| 2:49
| Tokyo, Japan
|
|-
| Win
| align=center| 3–0
| Tetsuo Katsuta
| Decision (majority)
| SB 15 - SuperBrawl 15
| 
| align=center| 2
| align=center| 5:00
| Honolulu, Hawaii, United States
| 
|-
| Win
| align=center| 2–0
| Jeremy Bolt
| Submission (rear naked choke)
| HOOKnSHOOT - Beyond
| 
| align=center| 1
| align=center| 11:02
| United States
| 
|-
| Win
| align=center| 1–0
| David Velasquez
| TKO (injury)
| PPKA - Wenatchee
| 
| align=center| N/A
| 
| Wenatchee, Washington, United States
|

References

External links

1971 births
Living people
American male mixed martial artists
Featherweight mixed martial artists
Mixed martial artists utilizing wrestling
Mixed martial artists from Washington (state)
Mixed martial arts referees
United States Air Force airmen

ja:デニス・ホールマン